In number theory, the Baker–Heegner–Stark theorem establishes the complete list of the quadratic imaginary number fields whose rings of integers are unique factorization domains. It solves a special case of Gauss's class number problem of determining the number of imaginary quadratic fields that have a given fixed class number.

Let  denote the set of rational numbers, and let  be a square-free integer. The Baker–Heegner–Stark theorem can then be stated as follows:

These are known as the Heegner numbers.

By replacing  with the discriminant  of  this list is often  written as:

History
This result was first conjectured by Gauss in Section 303 of his Disquisitiones Arithmeticae (1798).  It was essentially proven by Kurt Heegner in 1952, but Heegner's proof had some minor gaps and the theorem was not accepted until Harold Stark gave a complete proof in 1967, which had many commonalities to Heegner's work, but sufficiently many differences that Stark considers the proofs to be different. Heegner "died before anyone really understood what he had done". Stark formally filled in the gap in Heegner's proof in 1969 (other contemporary papers produced various similar proofs by modular functions, but Stark concentrated on explicitly filling Heegner's gap).

Alan Baker gave a completely different proof slightly earlier (1966) than Stark's work (or more precisely Baker reduced the result to a finite amount of computation, with Stark's work in his 1963/4 thesis already providing this computation), and won the Fields Medal for his methods. Stark later pointed out that Baker's proof, involving linear forms in 3 logarithms, could be reduced to only 2 logarithms, when the result was already known from 1949 by Gelfond and Linnik.

Stark's 1969 paper  also cited the 1895 text by Heinrich Martin Weber and noted that if Weber had "only made the observation that the reducibility of [a certain equation] would lead to a Diophantine equation, the class-number one problem would have been solved 60 years ago". Bryan Birch notes that Weber's book, and essentially the whole field of modular functions, dropped out of interest for half a century: "Unhappily, in 1952 there was no one left who was sufficiently expert in Weber's Algebra to appreciate Heegner's achievement."

Deuring, Siegel, and Chowla all gave slightly variant proofs by modular functions in the immediate years after Stark. Other versions in this genre have also cropped up over the years. For instance, in 1985, Monsur Kenku gave a proof using the Klein quartic (though again utilizing modular functions). And again, in 1999, Imin Chen gave another variant proof by modular functions (following Siegel's outline).

The work of Gross and Zagier (1986)  combined with that of Goldfeld (1976) also gives an alternative proof.

Real case
On the other hand, it is unknown whether there are infinitely many d > 0 for which Q() has class number 1. Computational results indicate that there are many such fields. Number Fields with class number one provides a list of some of these.

Notes

References

.

Theorems in algebraic number theory